The 2023 Nigerian Senate elections in Akwa Ibom State will be held on 25 February 2023, to elect the 3 federal Senators from Akwa Ibom State, one from each of the state's three senatorial districts. The elections will coincide with the 2023 presidential election, as well as other elections to the Senate and elections to the House of Representatives; with state elections being held two weeks later. Primaries were held between 4 April and 9 June 2022.

Background
The previous Senate elections, only one of the three incumbent senators were returned, with North-East District Senator Bassey Albert Akpan (PDP) being re-elected whilst both PDP-turned-APC senators (the North-West District's Godswill Akpabio and the South District's Nelson Effiong) were defeated in their re-election bids. In the North-East district, Akpan held his seat for the PDP with 70% of the vote; in the APC-held seats, the PDP's Chris Ekpenyong and Akon Eyakenyi won with 58% in the North-West district and 73% in the South district, respectively. Although the North-West result was later partially voided and a supplementary election called, Akpabio declined to contest the race and Ekpenyong was easily returned to the election. These results were a part of a reassertion of PDP dominance in the state with Akpabio and his allies losing; the party also won every House of Representatives seat and retained control of the House of Assembly. The PDP presidential nominee, Atiku Abubakar, also won the state easily with about 68% and Governor Udom Gabriel Emmanuel was re-elected with nearly 75% of the vote in the gubernatorial election.

In the first half the 2019–2023 term, Ekpenyong and Eyakenyi were noted for only having a single bill each while Akpan sponsored nine bills. During the second half of the term, Akpan gained publicity due to his continued trial for fraud charges and his defection to the YPP in July 2022.

Overview

Summary

Akwa Ibom North-East 

The Akwa Ibom North-East Senatorial District covers the local government areas of Etinan, Ibesikpo Asutan, Ibiono-Ibom, Itu, Nsit-Atai, Nsit-Ibom, Nsit-Ubium, Uruan, and Uyo. The district is centered around the city of Uyo and is sometimes referred to as the "Uyo Senatorial District." The incumbent is Bassey Albert Akpan (YPP), who was elected with 70.4% of the vote in 2019 as a member of the PDP. In March 2022, Akpan announced that he would run for governor of Akwa Ibom State, instead of seeking re-election. However, Akpan withdrew on the date of the PDP gubernatorial primary in May 2022. Two months later, he joined the YPP to become its gubernatorial nominee.

Primary elections

All Progressives Congress 

On the primary date, two candidates contested an indirect primary in Uyo that ended with Ndem Ndem emerging as the nominee after results showed him defeating Emmanuel Ekpenyong by a 18% margin. However, as in other Senate and House of Representatives primaries, state party leadership plotted to substitute in a different person—Emaeyak Ukpong—as party nominee; Ukpong's name was submitted to INEC but the commission had previously rejected the substitution plot. However, by the time the final nominee list was released, Emaeyak Ukpong was provisionally recognized as the nominee.

People's Democratic Party 

On the primary date, an indirect primary resulted in the victory of Aniekan Bassey—the Speaker of the Akwa Ibom State House of Assembly and MHA for Uruan. Bassey beat first runner-up Uwem Ita Etuk, the former Chairman of the Board of the Akwa Ibom Water Company who had withdrawn prior to the exercise, by a 90% margin.

General election

Results

Akwa Ibom North-West 

The Akwa Ibom North-West district covers the local government areas of Abak, Essien Udim, Etim Ekpo, Ika, Ikono, Ikot Ekpene, Ini, Obot-Akara, Oruk Anam, and Ukanafun. The district is centered around the city of Ikot Ekpene and is sometimes referred to as the "Ikot Ekpene Senatorial District;" it is also noted for its ethnic Anaang majority. The incumbent is Chris Ekpenyong (PDP), who was first elected with 58.4% of the vote in 2019 before being removed and later winning the supplementary election in January 2020, opted not to seek re-election.

Primary elections

All Progressives Congress 

On the primary date, three candidates contested an indirect primary of the INEC-recognised Udo-Edehe-aligned faction in Ikot Ekpene that ended with Udom Ekpoudom—a former Deputy Inspector General of Police—emerging as the nominee after results showed him defeating Joseph Akpan and former MHR Ekperikpe Ekpo by a wide margin; Ekpoudom thanked APC delegates in his acceptance speech before promising quality representation if elected to the Senate. The Akpabio-faction held a parallel primary in which Ekpo won but it was not recognized by INEC. As in other APC Senate and House of Representatives primaries, Akpabio's faction (in control of the state party) plotted to substitute in a different person—former Governor, former Senator, and former Minister Godswill Akpabio himself—as party nominee. After trying to nullify the original primary then holding a new election on 10 June that Akpabio won, state party leadership submitted Akpabio's name as the nominee; however, INEC never recognised the legitimacy of the Akpabio factional leadership due to its questionable electoral origins and thus rejected the list. In response, both Ekpoudom and Akpabio approached the courts with Ekpoudom attempting to force the state APC to submit his name to INEC and Akpabio trying to force INEC to accept his candidacy. Akpabio's lawsuit emerged successful in September as a court ordered INEC to list him as nominee.

People's Democratic Party 

On the primary date, screened candidates contested an indirect primary at the Ikot Ekpene Township Stadium that ended with former PDP National Legal Adviser Emmanuel Enoidem's victory as none of his opponents received any votes.

General election

Results

Akwa Ibom South 

The Akwa Ibom South district covers the local government areas of Eastern Obolo, Eket, Esit Eket, Ibeno, Ikot-Abasi, Mbo, Mkpat-Enin, Okobo, Onna, Oron, Udung-Uko, and Urue-Offong/Oruko. The district is centered around the city of Eket and is sometimes referred to as the "Eket Senatorial District;" it is also noted for its ethnic Oron majority. The incumbent is Akon Eyakenyi (PDP), who was elected with 73.2% of the vote in 2019, did not run for re-election and later became the PDP deputy gubernatorial nominee.

Primary elections

All Progressives Congress 

On the primary date, the INEC monitoring team reported the non-conduct of the APC primary. The Akpabio faction of the APC submitted former commissioner Martins Udo-Inyang's name to INEC but, like other names submitted by the faction, it was initially rejected. However, by the time the final nominee list was released in October, Udo-Inyang was provisionally recognized as the nominee.

People's Democratic Party 

On the primary date, four candidates contested an indirect primary in Onna that resulted in former commissioner Ekong Sampson emerging as the nominee after results showed him defeating MHRs Francis Uduyok and Patrick Ifon by a wide margin.

Campaign
In November, as the election neared, Sampson and YPP nominee Akparawa Ephraim Inyang-Eyen entered into a public spat over the validity of zoning in the senatorial seat. Sampson accused Inyang-Eyen of self-centeredly disregarding the district's history of zoning while Inyang-Eyen contended that there was no zoning in the seat.

General election

Results

See also 
 2023 Nigerian Senate election
 2023 Nigerian elections

Notes

References 

Akwa Ibom State senatorial elections
2023 Akwa Ibom State elections
Akwa Ibom State Senate elections